Mojs is a masculine given name. It is borne by:

 Mojs I (died after 1233), Hungarian noble and Palatine of Hungary between 1228 and 1231
 Mojs II (died 1280), Hungarian baron and Palatine of Hungary from 1270 to 1272, son of Mojs I
 Mojs I Ákos (died after 1299), Hungarian baron and master of the treasury
 Mojs II Ákos (died 1320), rebellious Hungarian lord, son of Mojs I Ákos

See also
 Morison equation, a fluid dynamics equation sometimes called the MOJS equation (from the initials of its four creators)
 Moys, the German name for Ujazd, Zgorzelec, a district in Poland 

Hungarian masculine given names